Riz Maslen is an English electronic musician. During the mid-1990s, she worked with 4hero and Future Sound of London. After playing keyboards for the Beloved, she took out a loan, built a home studio and created her first albums there. In 1995, she signed as Neotropic under the label Ntone and soon after as Small Fish with Spine to Oxygen Music Works in New York. She continues to be a prominent figure in experimental electronic music.

Discography

Neotropic
 Tumble Weed EP - N-Tone - 1995
 15 Levels of Magnification LP - N-Tone - 1995
 Laundrophonic EP - N-Tone - 1996
 15 Levels of Magnification Remixes EP - N-Tone - 1997 
 Ultra Freaky Orange EP - N-Tone - 1998
 Mr Brubaker's Strawberry Alarm Clock LP - N-Tone - 1998 (Fact Magazine ranked the album at 31 on its list of "The 50 Best Trip-Hop Albums of All Time" in 2015)
 La Prochaine Fois LP - N-Tone - 2001
 "Sunflower Girl" 7" - N-Tone - 2002 
 White Rabbits LP - Mush - 2004
 Prestatyn EP - Council Folk Recordings - 2006
 Whiter Rabbits 2 x LP - Squids Eye Records - 2008
 Equestrienne LP - Council Folk Recordings - 2009

Small Fish with Spine
 Stickleback EP - Oxide - 1996
 The Hilltop EP - Apollo - 1996
 Fugu EP - Oxide - 1996
 I Hate Your Remixes EP - Oxide - 1996
 Fugu Remixed EP - Oxide - 1996
 Ultimate Sushi LP - Oxide - 1999

Remix work
Tracks by Mantronik, Low, Frank Chickens, Sky Crys Mary, DJ Food, Ekko, Mich Gerber, Skinny Puppy, Ulver, Thread, Fujiya & Miyagi and :papercutz.

Filmography
Dish - written and directed by Meloni Poole, Film Four and Film Council. Shown at London Film Festival 2001 and competition at International Film Festivals.
Remote Control - Kohoutek documentary at various film events around London.
Murder in Paradise - documentary for Channel 4 broadcast early 2002.
La Prochaine Fois - directed Riz Maslen, shown at Leeds film festival 2000, Pompidou Centre in Paris 2000 and Sundance Film Festival 2002.
Vigilarie - Riz Maslen and Kaffe Matthews. A film about surveillance as part of the Future Sonic Festival in Manchester 2001, FutureSonic Tour 2004 Bristol / Birmingham / Liverpool.

Videogame work
Maslen also provided vocals to the Grand Theft Auto: Liberty City Stories soundtrack.

References

External links
 www.neotropic.net
 La Prochaine Fois at Squidattack
 Neotropic Myspace profile
 Riz Maslen's YouTube channel
  Riz Maslen interview concerning Neotropic at More than sounds

English electronic musicians
Living people
English women in electronic music
English record producers
British women record producers
Year of birth missing (living people)